was a 19th-century Japanese scholar of Western studies, or "Rangaku". In 1837, he published the first volume of his , a compilation of scientific books in Dutch, which describes a wide range of scientific knowledge from the West. Most of the Dutch original material appears to be derived from William Henry's 1799 Elements of Experimental Chemistry. In particular, the book contains a very detailed description of the electric battery invented by Volta forty years earlier in 1800. The battery itself was constructed by Udagawa in 1831 and used in experiments, including medical ones, based on a belief that electricity could help cure illnesses.

Udagawa's Science of Chemistry also reports for the first time in details the findings and theories of Lavoisier in Japan.

Notes

References

External links

 舎密開宗 PDF files of Seimi Kaisō provided by the library of Nakamura Gakuen University (Japanese)

1798 births
1846 deaths
Japanese scientists
Japanese naturalists
Rangaku
19th-century Japanese chemists